Talia Lugacy is an American film director, writer and producer. She is best known for her work on the films Descent and This Is Not a War Story.

Life and career
Lugacy was born in New York City, New York to Moroccan and Greek parents. She graduated from New York University Tisch School of the Arts. She is an assistant professor of Screen Studies at Eugene Lang College of Liberal Arts at The New School.

Lugacy's debut feature film, Descent, premiered at the Tribeca Film Festival in 2007 and it was a New York Times Critics' Pick. In 2021, her second feature film This Is Not a War Story, premiered at 2021 SF Indie Fest, where it won the Audience Award for Best Narrative Feature. She is also slated to direct the upcoming feature film Whitey on the Moon.

Filmography

As actress
 2014 : The Shape of Something Squashed
 2021 : This Is Not a War Story

Awards and nominations

References

External links
 

American women film directors
American women screenwriters
21st-century American women
American women film producers
American film actresses
Year of birth missing (living people)
Living people